Noon Sunday is a 1970 action film directed by Terry Bourke about two mercenaries. The film was the first feature produced in Guam.

Production
Terry Bourke and producer Gordon Mailloux had previously worked on the film Sampan together, which had been a success. They decided to make a second film in Guam, in part to establish local facilities which could be used by Japanese film crews who often used the island to shoot commercials and films. Money was raised from local investors and the Guam Economic Development Authority and Crown International agreed to distribute.

Shooting took two to three months using a combination of local actors and Hollywood talent.

Reception
The film was screened all around the world, making $25,000 in Guam, but according to Mailloux, Crown International took all the money.

References

External links

Films shot in Guam
1970 films
1970 action films
Crown International Pictures films
Films set in Oceania
1970s English-language films
Films directed by Terry Bourke